Amida is a genus of ladybirds primarily found in Asia. A relatively small genus although new species are still being discovered and described in China and Vietnam.

References 

 

Insects of Vietnam
Insects of China
Coccinellidae genera
Taxa named by George Lewis (coleopterist)